NGC 12 is an intermediate spiral galaxy in the Pisces constellation. It was discovered by William Herschel on December 6, 1790.

References

External links
 
 

Galaxies discovered in 1790
Intermediate spiral galaxies
Pisces (constellation)
0012
00074
00645
17901206